Chusovskoy (masculine), Chusovskaya (feminine), or Chusovskoye (neuter) is the name of several rural localities in Russia.

Modern localities
Chusovskoy, Chelyabinsk Oblast, a settlement under the administrative jurisdiction of the Town of Verkhny Ufaley in Chelyabinsk Oblast
Chusovskoy, Perm Krai, a settlement in Cherdynsky District of Perm Krai

Alternative names
Chusovskaya, alternative name of Chusovaya, a village in Verkhnepeskovsky Selsoviet of Kataysky District in Kurgan Oblast;